Odd Ove Oppedal (17 June 1936 – 27 May 2018) was a Norwegian footballer who played as a midfielder for Brann from 1953 to 1964. He played a total of 175 league and cup matches for the club, scoring 20 goals. He was captain of the Brann teams that won the Norwegian Premier League in 1962 and 1963.

Oppedal was capped once by Norway, in a 1962 friendly against Finland in his hometown Bergen.

References

External links
 

1936 births
2018 deaths
Norwegian footballers
Norway international footballers
SK Brann players
Footballers from Bergen
Association football midfielders